César Carlos "chalaca" Gonzales was a professional football player from Peru. He currently has entered the coaching business and has led Peruvian teams such as Sport Boys. He is widely known for his constant bicycle kicks, and for them received the nickname "chalaca," which is the Spanish term for the bicycle kick.

References

Living people
Peruvian footballers
Sporting Cristal footballers
Sport Boys managers
Association footballers not categorized by position
Year of birth missing (living people)
Peruvian football managers
Deportivo Municipal managers
Universidad Técnica de Cajamarca managers